Chóvar is a municipality in the comarca of Alto Palancia, Castellón, Valencia, Spain.

Municipalities in the Province of Castellón
Alto Palancia